Richard Frederick Lefevre Blunt, known as Frederick, was the first Anglican Bishop of Hull in the modern era; and served from 1891 until his death in 1910.

Life

Born in 1833 and educated at Merchant Taylors' and King's College London, his first post after Ordination was as a curate at St Paul, Cheltenham.  After serving as vicar of Scarborough and Archdeacon of the East Riding (1873–1891) he was elevated in 1891 to the episcopate as a suffragan to the Archbishop of York.

He was vicar of All Saints, Hessle (near Hull) from 1905 to 1910. He died on 23 January 1910 and is buried at St Andrew's Church, Ham.

Bishop Frederick Blunt (1833-1910) was grandfather of Anthony Blunt (1907-1983).

Notes

1833 births
People from Chelsea, London
1910 deaths
People educated at Merchant Taylors' School, Northwood
Archdeacons of the East Riding
Alumni of King's College London
Bishops of Hull
19th-century Church of England bishops
20th-century Church of England bishops